Gordon Harris (2 June 1940 – 10 February 2014) was a professional footballer who played as a midfielder in the Football League for Burnley and Sunderland. He was capped twice for England under-23 team while a Burnley player, and once for the full national team, on 5 January 1966 in a 1–1 draw with Poland, as a late replacement for the injured Bobby Charlton.

Harris died of cancer on 10 February 2014.

Honours
 Burnley
 Football League First Division champions: 1959–60
 FA Cup runner-up: 1962

References

External links
 

1940 births
2014 deaths
Footballers from Worksop
English footballers
Association football midfielders
England international footballers
England under-23 international footballers
Firbeck Main F.C. players
Burnley F.C. players
Sunderland A.F.C. players
South Shields F.C. (1936) players
English Football League players
English Football League representative players
People from Bassetlaw District
Footballers from Nottinghamshire
FA Cup Final players